Vladimir Lyubovny (born June 28, 1973), commonly known as DJ Vlad, is an American interviewer, journalist, and former disc jockey. He is the CEO of video and news website VladTV.com. His YouTube channel, djvlad, features his interviews of multiple music artists and entertainers and currently has over five million subscribers. He has also produced and directed films. He currently lives in Calabasas, California.

Early life
Lyubovny was born in Kyiv, Ukraine (then part of the Soviet Union) to a Russian Jewish family and moved to the United States at the age of five, first living in Springfield, Massachusetts before his family settled down in San Mateo, California. Lyubovny became interested in hip hop in his youth when N.W.A released their debut album.

Career
Lyubovny was initially making hip hop beats, but later quit when he realized he would not be successful at it. He began DJing after experimenting with a friend's equipment. In a 2010 interview with Parlé Magazine, he stated: "I kinda reached this point where I was like 'I really wanna do music. Let me try and concentrate and do music as well'." He  directed on the American Gangster television series, as well as the documentary film Ghostride the Whip.

Lyubovny later launched VladTV.com and initially uploaded MP3 files of DJ mixtapes. He moved to New York City and released the Rap Phenomenon mixtape series. He was also making hip hop DVDs, but was financially struggling as DVD sales began to decline. In 2008, Lyubovny turned his attention towards YouTube, which had recently launched its Partner Program which allows content creators to earn money. Lyubovny then decided to drop all other endeavours and focus on YouTube full-time.

In August 2008, Lyubovny was assaulted by rapper Rick Ross's entourage after he covered a story on the rapper's former career as a corrections officer. Lyubovny filed a $4 million lawsuit. On April 15, 2010, a New York Federal Jury awarded Lyubovny $300,000 in his civil suit, finding Ross liable for setting Lyubovny up for the attack at the 2008 Ozone Awards in Houston, Texas.

In April 2009, the Star & Buc Wild show joined the VladTV family to do a daily feature. In May 2010, Lyubovny voiced himself for a cameo in The Boondocks episode "Bitches to Rags".

In December 2016, Lyubovny interviewed Soulja Boy, who explained events surrounding a home invasion and shooting in 2008. The interview went viral, with many questioning the validity of Soulja Boy's claims. Numerous people parodied Soulja Boy's interview online, including rapper Joe Budden, and comedians Mike Epps and DC Young Fly, in what was ironically dubbed the "Soulja Boy Challenge".

Personal life
In September 2022 Lyubovny revealed he suffers from obsessive compulsive disorder.

References

External links
 

1973 births
Living people
Ukrainian people of Jewish descent
American hip hop musicians
American hip hop DJs
Jewish Ukrainian musicians
Jewish American musicians
Ukrainian Jews
Ukrainian emigrants to the United States
Soviet emigrants to the United States
American YouTubers
Ukrainian YouTubers
Musicians from Kyiv
UC Berkeley College of Engineering alumni
21st-century American Jews